Potok Wielki Drugi is a settlement in the administrative district of Gmina Potok Wielki, within Janów Lubelski County, Lublin Voivodeship, in eastern Poland.

References

Potok Wielki Drugi